This article lists those who were potential candidates for the Republican nomination for Vice President of the United States in the 1980 election. Former California Governor Ronald Reagan won the 1980 Republican nomination for President of the United States, and chose former CIA Director George H. W. Bush as his running mate. 

Reagan had considered naming former president Gerald Ford as his running mate, but after Ford and Reagan were unable to agree to be on the same ticket (a televised interview with Ford brought up possibility of a "co-presidency"), Reagan turned to Bush, his primary rival for the 1980 Republican nomination. Though Bush had criticized Reagan's policies, Reagan chose Bush to help unify the party, and Bush agreed to be on the ticket and to support Reagan's platform. 

The Reagan–Bush ticket would go on to defeat the Democratic tickets of Carter–Mondale in 1980 and Mondale–Ferraro in 1984. Bush was later elected president in his own right in 1988.

Potential running mates

See also
Ronald Reagan 1980 presidential campaign
1980 Republican Party presidential primaries
1980 Republican National Convention
1980 United States presidential election
List of United States major party presidential tickets

References

Vice presidency of the United States
1980 United States presidential election
Ronald Reagan
George H. W. Bush
Gerald Ford